Mugdha Manava is a 1977 Indian Kannada-language film, directed by K. S. L. Swamy (Ravi) and produced by Lalithamma. The film stars Srinath, Shubha, Kalyan Kumar and Ambareesh. The film has musical score by Vijaya Bhaskar.

Cast
Srinath
Shubha
Kalyan Kumar
Ambareesh
B. V. Radha
Leelavathi
S. Shivaram

Soundtrack
The music was composed by Vijaya Bhaskar.

References

External links
 

1977 films
1970s Kannada-language films
Films scored by Vijaya Bhaskar
Films directed by K. S. L. Swamy